Predator is the eleventh studio album by German heavy metal band Accept, released in 1996. It was produced by Michael Wagener and recorded at 16th Ave. Sound Studios, Nashville, Tennessee. Predator was Accept's last album before their hiatus from 1997, and their last recording with singer Udo Dirkschneider.

Drums and percussion, except on "Primitive", and additional percussion on "Predator" were played by Michael Cartellone from Damn Yankees and Lynyrd Skynyrd.

Track listing

Credits
Band members
Udo Dirkschneider – vocals
Wolf Hoffmann – guitars, cover art
Peter Baltes – bass, lead vocals on "Lay It Down", "It Ain't Over Yet" and "Primitive", co-lead vocals on "Crossroads"

Additional musicians
Michael Cartellone – drums on all tracks, except "Primitive"
Kalei Lam – additional percussion on "Predator"

Production
Michael Wagener – producer, engineer, mixing
Jeff Gudenrath, Doug Trantow – assistant engineers
Stephen Marcussen – mastering at Precision Mastering, Los Angeles
Bill Barnes – art direction
Swatson, Barnes & Co. – cover design

Charts

References

1996 albums
Accept (band) albums
Albums produced by Michael Wagener
RCA Records albums